Fly Me is a 2017 debut novel written by American writer Daniel Riley.

References

2017 American novels
Novels set in Los Angeles
2017 debut novels
Little, Brown and Company books